Flesh and the Devil  is an American silent romantic drama film released in 1927 by Metro-Goldwyn-Mayer and stars Greta Garbo, John Gilbert, Lars Hanson, and Barbara Kent, directed by Clarence Brown, and based on the novel The Undying Past by Hermann Sudermann.

In 2006, Flesh and the Devil was selected for preservation in the United States National Film Registry by the Library of Congress as being "culturally, historically, or aesthetically significant".

Plot
Two childhood friends, Leo and Ulrich, grow up to be soldiers in Germany. Leo becomes infatuated with Felicitas, the wife of a powerful count (a marriage about which Felicitas neglects to inform Leo). The count calls for a duel of honor with Leo, but insists that it be done under the false pretense that the quarrel was due to angry words exchanged between the two at a card game to protect the count's reputation. Leo kills the count in the duel, but then is punished by the military by being sent to Africa for five years.

Due to Ulrich's intervention, Leo only serves three years before being recalled home. On his return journey, he focuses on his dream of being reunited with Felicitas. Before he left for Africa, Leo had asked Ulrich to take care of Felicitas's needs while he was away. Ulrich — unaware that his friend is in love with Felicitas — falls in love with her and marries her.

Upon his return, Leo finds himself torn between Felicitas — which the woman encourages — and his friendship for Ulrich. Condemned by a local pastor for continuing to associate with Felicitas, Leo eventually loses control of his emotions, leading to a climactic duel between the two boyhood friends. While racing to stop the duel, Felicitas falls through a layer of thin ice and drowns. Meanwhile, the friends reconcile, realizing that their friendship is more important than Felicitas.

Cast
 John Gilbert as Leo von Harden
 Greta Garbo as Felicitas von Rhaden
 Lars Hanson as Ulrich von Eltz
 Barbara Kent as Hertha
 William Orlamond as Uncle Kutowski
 George Fawcett as Pastor Voss
 Eugenie Besserer as Leo's Mother
 Marc McDermott as Count von Rhaden
 Marcelle Corday as Minna

 Uncredited
 Max Barwyn as Ball Guest
 Philippe De Lacy as Leo as a Boy
 Polly Moran as Woman with Bouquet
 Cecilia Parker as Twin at Ball and the Church
 Linda Parker as Twin at Ball and the Church
 Russ Powell as Family Retainer w/Flag
 Carl 'Major' Roup as Train Station Vendor
 Rolfe Sedan as Women's Hat Salesman
 Ellinor Vanderveer as Guest at Ball
 Glen Walters as Family Retainer

Production

Flesh and the Devil, produced in 1926, premiered at New York's Capitol Theatre on January 9, 1927 and marked a turning point for Garbo's personal and professional life. Initially, she refused to participate in the film. She had just finished The Temptress and was tired, plus her sister had recently died of cancer and she was upset that her contract with Metro-Goldwyn-Mayer did not allow her to take the long trip back to Sweden. A sternly worded letter from MGM (read by Garbo biographer Barry Paris on the audio commentary for the 2005 DVD release of the film) warned her of dire consequences if she did not report for work. This was a rehearsal of sorts for a pitched battle Garbo would fight against studio heads after Flesh and the Devil was completed, which ended up with Garbo becoming one of the highest-paid actresses in Hollywood up to that time.

The romantic chemistry between Garbo and Gilbert was a director's dream because it was not faked. The two actors quickly became involved in their own romantic affair and before production of the film was completed had already moved in together (per Paris' commentary). Hollywood legend has it that it was also during production that Gilbert proposed to Garbo; she accepted, a high-profile wedding was arranged, but Garbo backed out. Paris disputes that this could have happened in the midst of production. Regardless of the chronology, Flesh and the Devil marked the beginning of one of the most famous romances of Hollywood's golden age. They would also continue making movies together into the Sound Era, though Gilbert's career would collapse in the early 1930s while Garbo's soared.

Garbo was so impressed with Clarence Brown's direction and William Daniels's cinematography that she continued to work with both of them in her subsequent films at MGM.  She was particularly insistent on the use of Daniels as her prime cinematographer.

Box office
The film earned $603,000 in the United States and $658,000 elsewhere, bringing it $1,261,000 worldwide, netting the studio a $466,000 profit.

Accolades
The film is recognized by American Film Institute in these lists:
 2002: AFI's 100 Years...100 Passions – Nominated

Home media
Flesh and the Devil was restored and released to DVD with The Temptress in September 2005 as part of a collection by Turner Classic Movies entitled Garbo Silents. The DVD includes an alternative, upbeat ending.

References

External links 

 
 
 
 
Flesh and the Devil essay by Daniel Eagan in America's Film Legacy: The Authoritative Guide to the Landmark Movies in the National Film Registry, A&C Black, 2010 , pages 122-124 

1927 films
1927 romantic drama films
1920s American films
American black-and-white films
American romantic drama films
American silent feature films
Films about duels
Films directed by Clarence Brown
Films with screenplays by Benjamin Glazer
Films produced by Irving Thalberg
Films based on works by Hermann Sudermann
Films set in the 1890s
Films set in Austria
Metro-Goldwyn-Mayer films
United States National Film Registry films
Silent romantic drama films
Silent American drama films